The Extraordinary Seaman is a 1969 American comedy war film directed by John Frankenheimer and starring David Niven, Faye Dunaway, Alan Alda, Mickey Rooney, and Jack Carter. Apart from his participation in the documentaries That's Entertainment! (1974), and That's Entertainment! III (1994), the  film is notable for being the last film Mickey Rooney acted in which was released by Metro-Goldwyn-Mayer, his studio during the period of his major stardom during the 1930s and 1940s.

Plot
Towards the end of World War II four United States Navy sailors—the accountant Lieutenant Krim, the cook Oglethorpe, the gunner's mate Toole, and the Cheyenne seaman Lightfoot—are separated from their ship and are marooned on an island in the Philippines. They discover the British Royal Navy officer, Commander Finchhaven, aboard the wreck of the gunboat HMS Curmudgeon. Finchhaven persuades them to launch an attack on Japanese positions, hoping to redeem the family honor and his own tattered record from the First World War. The sailors repair the ship with help from garage owner Jennifer Winslow. After launching the ship, Finchhaven confesses he is a ghost condemned to sail the seas forever after falling down drunk before his first battle in the Great War. With his typical luck he actually succeeds in sinking an Imperial Japanese Navy cruiser -- after it had officially surrendered to the US Navy. As a result, he is seen again consigned to sailing his ship forever, this time in a children's amusement park lake, to await another war for a chance at redemption.

Production 
Metro-Goldwyn-Mayer purchased the rights to Philip Rock's novel The Extraordinary Seaman in 1967. The film was primarily shot in Yucatán and Coatzacoalcos, Mexico, as well as at MGM studios in Culver City, California and in Santa Barbara, California. The film was divided into six sections named after the volumes of Winston Churchill's The Second World War.

Cast
David Niven as Lt. Commander Finchhaven, R.N.
Faye Dunaway as Jennifer Winslow
Alan Alda as Lieutenant (junior grade) Morton Krim
Mickey Rooney as Cook 3rd Class W.J. Oglethorpe
Jack Carter as Chief Gunner's Mate Orville Toole

Reception

This film was widely panned by the critics and barely achieved any kind of a commercial release. Director John Frankenheimer said in an interview that of all the films he directed this was his least favorite. He said it was the only film which he ever made that he considered "an absolute disaster from beginning to end".

See also
 List of American films of 1969

References

External links

1969 films
1960s adventure comedy films
American World War II films
1960s English-language films
1960s ghost films
Films directed by John Frankenheimer
Metro-Goldwyn-Mayer films
Military humor in film
Pacific War films
American adventure comedy films
Films scored by Maurice Jarre
Films shot in Mexico
1969 comedy films
Films set in the Philippines
Films about the United States Navy in World War II
Supernatural films
American supernatural films
1960s supernatural films
1960s war comedy films
American war comedy films
1960s American films